Abdal is a village in the Aghdam District of Azerbaijan.

History
The village was captured by Armenian forces during the First Nagorno-Karabakh war and all of its original Azerbaijani inhabitants were driven out. It was administrated as part of the Askeran Province of the self-proclaimed Republic of Artsakh under the same name. The village was returned to Azerbaijan on 20 November 2020 per the 2020 Nagorno-Karabakh ceasefire agreement following the 2020 Nagorno-Karabakh war.

References

External links 
 
 Satellite map at Maplandia.com

Populated places in Aghdam District